Clarence E. Shurtleff was involved in the film business in the U.S. including as a producer for his namesake film company, C. E. Shurtleff, Inc.

In 1907, he held a finance position at a clothing mill in Chicago. He was a sales manager for Select pictures and W.W. Hodkinson's distribution company.

In 1920, he signed a 3-year contract for the film production rights to Peter B. Kyne's short stories. He also made a deal for the film rights to Jack London's stories.

Filmography
The Mutiny of the Elsinore (1920 film), directed by Edward Sloman
Burning Daylight (1920 film)
The Star Rover (1920)

Further reading
"Clarence E. Shurtleff Presents Jack London, 1919-1921" by Tony Williams in Wide Angle, 1993

References

American film producers